The Diocese of Mysore was one of the Protestant dioceses of the Church of South India, the successor of the Church of England, covering the erstwhile state of Mysore, now Karnataka

History of the Diocese
The Diocese of Mysore of the Church of South India was inaugurated in 1947. In 1970, the Diocese of Mysore was trifurcated for administrative purposes into three units, as a result of this there are now three dioceses,
Karnataka Northern Diocese,
Karnataka Southern Diocese,
Karnataka Central Diocese

Bishops of the Diocese
Mysore Diocese 
 Rt. Rev. Premaka Gurushantha (1947-1951) 
 Rt. Rev. Norman C. Sargant (1951-1971)
 Rt. Rev. H. D. L. Abraham (1966-1968)

References

Mysore
Christianity in Karnataka